André Jeanquartier (born 1941 in Le Locle, Switzerland) is a Swiss jazz pianist.

Education
After finishing school he started to work as teacher in Neuchâtel.

Later, he moved to Graz to study composition and finished his study in 1970 with an honors degree.

Career
He participated on several jazz festivals (Spain, Poland, Hungary, Yugoslavia, India etc.) and won the 1st prize in the jazz festival San Sebastian 1972 and the Music Promotion Prize of the City of Graz 1976.

Since 1983 he worked as teacher at the University of Music and Performing Arts Graz (KUG) and taught improvisation, piano practice and repertoire ensemble for vocalists. 
Since 2000, he also worked as a painter.

Personal life
In 1975, he got married. He currently has 3 children, a son and two daughters.

References

External links
 Personal page of André Jeanquartier

1941 births
Swiss jazz pianists
Living people
21st-century pianists